Robert Dartois (11 February 1900 – 13 January 1959) was a French actor. In 1948 he starred in the film The Lame Devil under Sacha Guitry.

He was born Robert Edouard Marcel Delandres in Trouville-sur-Mer, Calvados, France and died in Saint-Arnoult, Calvados, France.

Selected filmography
 Imperial Violets (1932)
 The Queen's Necklace (1946)

External links

French male film actors
1900 births
1959 deaths
People from Trouville-sur-Mer
20th-century French male actors